Te Kehu, also known as Te Whetu-o-te-ao, was a Māori woman of the Te Āti Awa iwi (tribe) of New Zealand.

Te Kehu was married to Rere-tā-whangawhanga with whom she had three sons, Wiremu Kīngi, Matiu and Enoka.

Te Kehu signed the Treaty of Waitangi on 19 May 1840 in Ōtaki, and was one of only a few women to sign the document. Her husband Rere-tā-whangawhanga also signed, but in Waikanae.

References

Te Āti Awa people
Signatories of the Treaty of Waitangi